The 2012–13 season is Omonia's 58th season in the Cypriot First Division and 64th year in existence as a football club. The pre-season tour this season took part once again in Poland. During the two weeks in Opalenica, Omonia will be playing four friendly games. Later on, the Greens are playing their debut game at GSP Stadium against Doxa Katokopia. Their last test before the season starts will be against Willem II in GSP Stadium on 27 July.  The European journey starts a less than week later when the team enters the 2012–13 UEFA Europa League third qualifying round. The league kick-off's in September when newcome Ayia Napa visits Nicosia for a tough clash. In the beginning of 2013, the team enters Cypriot Cup second round.

Current squad
Last Update: April 2, 2013

First team squad

  
 

For recent transfers, see List of Cypriot football transfers winter 2012–13.

Squad changes

In:

Out:

Squad stats

Top scorers

Last updated: March 18, 2013
Source: Match reports in Competitive matches

Captains
  Leandro
  Bruno Aguiar

Competitions

Overall

Pre-season

Cypriot First Division

Classification

Results summary

Results by round

Matches
Kick-off times are in CET.

Regular season

Second round

Group A

Results

UEFA Europa League

Third qualifying round

Cypriot Cup

Second round

Quarter-finals

Semi final

LTV Super Cup

AC Omonia seasons
Omonia